James Felix McKenney (born May 27, 1968) is an American writer, director, producer and actor, raised in Saco, Maine.

Career
He is known for creating non-traditional films in the horror and science fiction genres, produced by his company called MonsterPants. McKenney filmed for Dark Sky Films the supernatural thriller Hypothermia, the film stars Michael Rooker, Greg Finley and is shot in Mayfield, New York at Great Sacandaga Lake.

Filmography
Director

 Villain (2013)
 The Girl from Mars (2013)
 Hypothermia (2012)
 Satan Hates You (2009)
 Automatons (2006)
 The Off Season (2004)
 CanniBallistic! (2002)

References

External links
 
 MonsterPants

1968 births
American male film actors
American male screenwriters
Horror film directors
Living people
People from Saco, Maine
Film directors from Maine
Screenwriters from Maine